Saige Martin is an American artist, fund director, and politician. A Democrat, Martin was one of the first openly gay people, the first Latinx person, and the youngest person ever to sit on the Raleigh City Council. He served from 2019 until 2020, when he resigned due to the alleged sexual assault of several men and misconduct.

Early life and career 
Martin was born in foster care to fifteen-year old parents. He is of Puerto Rican descent on his father's side. He grew up homeless in Bucks County, Pennsylvania after his mother was forced out of her foster home. He graduated from Pennridge High School.

Martin has a bachelor of arts degree in Cultural Anthropology from Hawaii Pacific University, where he served as Student Body President. In his role as president, he worked with the city of Honolulu, the county, and the Governor's Office on multiple issues affecting the students at the university. Martin has graduate degree in Art and Design from North Carolina State University. While a graduate student, he spent a winter break volunteering with a non-profit organization at the Mexico–United States border. In March 2019 he presented a multimedia performance at the CRDM Symposium. Martin worked with the United Nations in Turkey while studying for a semester at Koç University, aiding Syrian refugees fleeing from the Syrian Civil War, and as part of the United Nations Millennium Campaign in New York City. He traveled to fifteen countries on behalf of the United Nations to partake in the U.N. My World Global Survey. He worked on President Barack Obama's 2012 presidential campaign in southern Philadelphia and was a communications consultant for Secretary of State Hillary Clinton's 2016 presidential campaign.

Martin has worked as a Fund Director, helping pilot new funding models for non-profit organizations. He has served on the boards of The Hope Center at Pullen, the Justice-Love Foundation, and LEAD NC.

Political career 
In March 2019 Martin announced his campaign for Raleigh City Council, against sitting councilwoman Kay Crowder for District D in Southwest Raleigh. Martin, who is openly gay and Latinx, ran with a progressive platform focusing on affordable housing, environmental reforms, establishing a Police Accountability Review Board, and revitalizing the council. He was endorsed by Indy Week, Equality NC, Ashley Christensen, and North Carolina Museum of Art director Larry Wheeler. On June 25, 2019 Martin spoke publicly, as a candidate for City Council, on the importance of the Stonewall Riots. He was elected in October 2019 as the first Latinx person and, alongside Councilman Jonathan Melton who was also elected in 2019 election, one of the first two openly gay men to sit on the City Council. Twenty-eight years old at the time of assuming office, Martin is the youngest person to serve on the Raleigh City Council.

As a member of the City Council, Martin spearheaded the Council's backroom deal to cancel Citizen Advisory Councils and was a vocal advocate for defunding the Raleigh Police Department. Martin, and Raleigh mayor Mary-Ann Baldwin, voted in secrecy on removing the city's nineteen Citizen Advisory Councils, which were formed in 1974. The only councilman to be left out of the secret vote was David Cox, who opposed the measure.

In April 2020 Martin, alongside Durham mayor Steve Schewel, Durham County Board of Commissioners chairwoman Wendy Jacobs, Durham County Commissioner Heidi Carter, Durham City Council members Javiera Caballero, Jillian Johnson, Mark-Anthony Middleton, and Charlie Reece, and Raleigh City Council member Nicole Stewart, pledged to take part in the #ShareYourCheck Challenge. They pledged all or part of their federal stimulus payments, part of an aid package to help Americans through the COVID-19 recession onset by the COVID-19 pandemic, to go to Siembra Solidarity Fund. The fund helps undocumented residents who were shut out of financial assistance due to their immigration status.

In June 2020 Martin defended protesters who were arrested, and victims of police brutality, during the George Floyd Protests in Raleigh, stating "Let’s get one thing straight: we DO NOT arrest peaceful protesters in the City of Raleigh. Both individuals detained this evening are black. Both are queer. One is a minor. This conduct is disgusting" on his Twitter account. Martin later tweeted that he would be presenting a plan to the City Council to defund and reallocate police funds, "to truly focus on the safety, wellbeing, and health of our black community."

Sexual assault allegations 
Martin resigned from the City Council on June 26, 2020 after allegations of sexual misconduct were made against him by four young male students at North Carolina State University. His resignation was accepted by Mayor Mary-Ann Baldwin. The students alleged in The News & Observer that Martin, while working as a graduate teaching assistant in 2018 and 2019, had sexually assaulted them or behaved inappropriately. One of the accusers was seventeen years old at the time of the alleged assault. Martin denied the allegations. Wake County District Attorney Lorrin Freeman asked the North Carolina State Bureau of Investigation to look into the accusations against Martin. In July 2020 Freeman announced that charges would not be pressed against Martin due to a lack of sufficient evidence. Juni Cuevas, the only accuser who agreed to be publicly identified, maintained he didn't want to pursue a criminal case. Martin's vacant seat was filled by Stormie Forte on July 14, 2020.

References 

Living people
21st-century American politicians
American politicians of Puerto Rican descent
Artists from Pennsylvania
American LGBT city council members
LGBT Hispanic and Latino American people
LGBT people from Pennsylvania
Gay politicians
Hawaii Pacific University alumni
Hispanic and Latino American politicians
Homeless people
Hispanic and Latino American artists
North Carolina Democrats
North Carolina State University alumni
People from Bucks County, Pennsylvania
Raleigh City Council members
United Nations officials
Year of birth missing (living people)